William Southerland Hixon (November 3, 1848 – September 13, 1921) was an American grocer, soapstone manufacturer and politician who served in the Chelsea, Massachusetts Common Council, and in the Massachusetts House of Representatives.

References

Republican Party members of the Massachusetts House of Representatives
Politicians from Chelsea, Massachusetts
Massachusetts city council members
People of Massachusetts in the American Civil War
1848 births
1921 deaths
People from Cornwall, New York